Death Wish V: The Face of Death is a 1994 American action thriller film and the fifth and final installment in the Death Wish film series, written and directed by Allan A. Goldstein. Yet again, Charles Bronson reprises his role in both his final theatrical starring role and his final appearance as the character Paul Kersey. In the film, Kersey tries to protect his girlfriend, Olivia Regent (Lesley-Anne Down) from brutal mobsters that are threatening her fashion business.

Plot
Seven years after Detective Sid Reiner discovered he was the vigilante, Paul Kersey has returned to New York City in the witness protection program, having assumed the name Paul Stewart. He is invited by his girlfriend, Olivia Regent, to a fashion show. Backstage, mobster Tommy O'Shea and his goons begin to muscle in. Tommy threatens Olivia, who is his ex-wife and mother to their daughter, Chelsea. When Paul discovers bruises on Olivia's wrist, she informs Paul of her ex-husband's behavior. Paul confronts Tommy, but Tommy's henchman Chicki Paconi threatens Paul with a revolver. The confrontation ends with the arrival of Chelsea. D.A. Brian Hoyle and his associate NYPD detective Lt. Hector Vasquez visit Paul's home. He informs them about Tommy O'Shea. Hoyle says they have been trying to nab Tommy for years, and he wants Olivia to testify. That night at a restaurant, Paul proposes to Olivia, who accepts. Olivia excuses herself to the bathroom and is attacked by Tommy's associate, Freddie "Flakes" Garrity. Flakes bashes her head against a mirror, disfiguring her. Freddie escapes, although Paul gets a look at him. Later, at the hospital, Paul is told that even if Olivia gets reconstructive surgery, her face will never be the same. While at the hospital, he meets Lt. Mickey King and his partner Janice Omori, who are working on the O'Shea's case. During a failed bugging mission against the mob, both O'Shea associate Albert and Janice are killed, getting struck by Freddie's car. Then, at the hospital, Lt. King warns Kersey not to go back to his old ways, saying that he has been working on the case for 16 years. Unimpressed, Kersey says that is a long time to be failing. Freddie and his henchmen, pretending to be the cops sent to protect Olivia, attack Paul and Olivia at her apartment. Freddie shoots Olivia in the back, killing her as the couple tries to escape. Paul jumps from the roof of his apartment, where he lands in a pile of trash bags, and is retrieved by the police. Tommy is cleared of involvement in Olivia's death and seeks custody of their daughter. Paul assaults Tommy, but his  Sal leaves him unconscious.

Paul plans to return to his vigilante methods and is assisted by Hoyle, who learns his department has been corrupted by Tommy. Paul poisons Chicki with cyanide disguised as sugar in a cannoli. He then kills Freddie with a remote-controlled explosive soccer ball. Tommy finds out from an informant that Paul is the vigilante killer, known for series of slayings and will be going after him for killing Olivia. The informant, revealed to be Vasquez, tries to kill Paul himself. However, Paul gets the upper hand and kills him. Hoyle arrives and finds that Tommy wants both him and Paul dead. Hoyle tells Paul he must never see him again, and Paul agrees. Using Chelsea as a bait, Tommy puts three henchmen named Frankie, Mickey and Angel (the same three thugs who murdered Paul's wife and raped his daughter twenty years earlier) to guard the dress factory. Once Paul gets inside, he uses a forklift as a bait to trick the henchmen. They manage to destroy it, but Paul appears behind them and shoots Angel's shotgun away from his hands, but shoots both Frankie and Mickey dead. After Paul makes Angel tell him where Chelsea is, he wraps Angel in plastic wrapper. Meanwhile, Chelsea makes a getaway and Sal and Tommy go after her, but Tommy sends Sal to go after Paul. While searching for Paul, Sal accidentally shoots Angel to death. After Sal finds Paul, the latter shoots causing Sal to fall fatally backward into a garment shredding machine. Paul finds Tommy, and makes him beg for mercy. Lt. King arrives, but is wounded by Tommy. Armed with Angel's shotgun, Paul corners Tommy and knocks him into an liming pool, where he disintegrates. King thanks Paul for saving his life and Paul gives Angel's shotgun to him. Paul goes to rejoin Chelsea, calling out to the injured King, "Hey Lieutenant, if you need any help, give me a call". The film ends with a freeze-frame of him walking.

Unfilmed alternate ending

In the original draft of the screenplay, Tommy O'Shea received a more merciful death by engaging in a shootout with Kersey gaining the upper hand by shooting apart the glass ceiling above O'Shea's head causing the glass to cut up O'Shea's face. Kersey would then finish O'Shea by shooting him in the chest.

Cast
 Charles Bronson as Paul Kersey / Mr vigilante
 Lesley-Anne Down as Olivia Regent
 Michael Parks as Tommy O'Shea
 Robert Joy as Freddie "Flakes" Garrity
 Saul Rubinek as District  Attorney Brian Hoyle
 Kenneth Welsh as Lieutenant Mickey King
 Lisa Inouye as Detective Janice Omori
 Miguel Sandoval as Lieutenant Hector Vasquez 
 Erica Lancaster as Chelsea O'Shea
 Chuck Shamata as Sal Paconi
 Kevin Lund as Chicki Paconi
 Scott Spidell as Frankie
 Tim MacMenamin as Mickey
 Sandro Limotta as Angel
 Melissa Illes as Runway Model
 Jefferson Mappin as Albert "Big Al"
 Michael Dunston as Reggie
 Claire Rankin as Maxine, O'Shea's Girlfriend
 Sharolyn Sparrow as Dawn, Garrity's Girlfriend
 Andrea Mann as Hoyle's Wife
 Marcello Meleca as Hoyle's Son
 Elena Kudaba as Paul's Housekeeper

Production

Development

The three previous films in the Death Wish series were produced by Cannon Films. In 1989, Cannon faced Chapter 11 bankruptcy and its financial records came under investigation by the U.S. Securities and Exchange Commission. Co-owners Menahem Golan and Yoram Globus also had a personal falling out during the collapse of their company. Golan soon launched his own company, 21st Century Film Corporation. The films of the new company tended to have small budgets and performed poorly at the box office. Meanwhile, the Death Wish films continued to enjoy popularity in the video and television market. Golan came up with the idea of a fifth Death Wish  film to serve as a much-needed hit for the company. Financing to start the film production was secured through a loan from the Lewis Horwitz Organization. Golan still owned an unused screenplay for a Death Wish film, submitted in the late 1980s by J. Lee Thompson and Gail Morgan Hickman, which had Paul Kersey battling against terrorists in Alcatraz Island, San Francisco. He decided against using it, since it would be too costly to produce. Instead, he hired Michael Colleary to write a new script.

Casting

After Charles Bronson was asked to reprise his role as Paul Kersey for a new installment in the Death Wish franchise, he ultimately backed down, saying that he felt that he was done with the franchise after Death Wish 4: The Crackdown (1987). His words backfired after his salary was between 5-6 million dollars, which was also more than a half of the entire budget. Golan initially reserved directorial duties for himself, but his preoccupation with directing Crime and Punishment reportedly prevented him from doing so. Michael Winner was available to direct, but was never asked to do so. According to Winner, his lack of interest in directing Death Wish 4: The Crackdown (1987) may have led Golan to count him out. Golan then hired Steve Carver for the job, an experienced director in the action film genre. Carver was so amused by this that he set up a lunch meeting during which, he recalled discussing with Bronson over the depiction of Paul Kersey. Bronson wanted the character to become more, "sympathetic and less violent as he thought the character was becoming repetitive and that there was nothing really for him to chew on. He wanted a lot of elements that made the character somewhat soft, wanting to get away from the blatant killing of bad guys and the vigilante stuff. He had some humorous ideas". After Carver took his notes from the meeting, he began revising the script with writer, Stephen Peters. Carver worked on the pre-production for two months before Golan decided to replace him after the decision to pare down the budget. His replacement was Allan A. Goldstein, who held dual citizenship as a Canadian and American. Carver believes that it was Goldstein's Canadian ties, which influenced the decision. Goldstein himself was surprised, since he specialized in drama films. Death Wish V: The Face of Death was his first action film. To prepare for directing the film, he tried familiarizing himself with the film series by watching the previous entries for the first time. He soon started revising the script. He attempted to insert humor and black comedy elements. At the time, Bronson and Allan had a strong friendship through the filming. Allan was so impressed by Bronson that he also tried to get a part as a director in Bronson's second-to-last television film, Breach of Faith: A Family of Cops 2 (1997), but failed. Michael Parks was hired for the role of Tommy O'Shea because Allan loved his work. His character was originally supposed to be an Italian mobster, but the character was turned into an Irish mobster. Goldstein also gave some leeway for Parks so his numerous lines in the film are completely improvised. For tax purposes, several of the roles had to be filled with Canadian actors. Among them were Robert Joy, Saul Rubinek, Kenneth Welsh and Erica Lancaster. Rubinek previously had a role as a subway mugger in the original Death Wish, while in this film he portrays D.A. Brian Hoyle. In a rejected early draft of this film, his character was revealed to be the cop that found a wounded Kersey during the ending of the original.

Filming

Filming began in early 1993. At first, there were several locations available all around the United States until the film producers chose a big studio in Wilmington, North Carolina that had originally been built and owned by the film producer of the first film, Dino De Laurentiis. The location was chosen as it wasn't controlled by unions and had previously attracted other film producers as the studio was used to cut costs. However, a lot of the money went on to Bronson's salary, so the film production was forced to change places to Toronto, Ontario. The change caused lots of problems for the production because film companies receive tax breaks when shooting in Canada, but in order to qualify for the discounts, a number of key positions have to be filled by Canadians. The budget had to be cut even lower to the point, the story became destroyed, which made Goldstein revise it afterwards. The previous films of the series were mostly shot on location, but the fifth film was mainly shot in a studio. All the scenes involving the dress factory were shot in a studio. Charles Bronson and the producer, Menahem Golan were not on speaking terms during the filming, only communicating by using director Allan A. Goldstein as an intermediary. Goldstein himself was uncertain of the reasons behind this adversarial relationship. Golan was not present for most of the shooting, preoccupied with filming Crime and Punishment (2002) in Russia.

Reception

Box office
Death Wish V was a box office disaster. The film was partially financed through an advanced payment by Trimark Pictures, in exchange for domestic theatrical and home video rights. Trimark released the film on January 14, 1994, to 248 movie theaters. It made $503,936 on its opening weekend. The final box office gross of the film in the United States market was estimated at just over $1.7 million. It was released for the home video market later in 1994. Rental records pointed to a solid presence of the film in the video market, but it was not as lucrative as Death Wish 4: The Crackdown (1987). The main cause of the problem was the 1994 Northridge earthquake that happened on January 17, 1994, just 3 days after the release. Multiple broken home video releases of the film led to the failure of the film and inability to buy or rent the film for a month.

Critical response
Death Wish V received overwhelmingly negative reviews and holds a rare 0% rating on Rotten Tomatoes based on reviews from 5 critics. On Metacritic it has a score of 25 out of 100 based on reviews from 6 critics, indicating "generally unfavorable reviews".

Chris Willman of the Los Angeles Times criticized the film series' repeated recycling of the same basic plotline, and Charles Bronson's perceptible boredom with the Paul Kersey role, and said that even fans of the series would find this particular installment unbearably dull. Stephen Holden of The New York Times also remarked that Bronson "sounds terminally bored", and criticised the film for its sadistic violence. Richard Harrington of The Washington Post said the film "looks and feels older than its original mold." He criticized that by this point Bronson was embarrassingly old for the part of an action hero (approaching 73 years old, at this time ), and that the Death Wish plot had been done past the point of any interest.

Varietys Joe Leydon likewise said the film "finds both the character and the series looking mighty tired." Like Willman, he said that Bronson seemed bored with his role and that the film failed to provide any fresh twist to the Death Wish plotline. He further remarked that series fans would find it a major disappointment due to the low body count, slow pace, and general lack of excitement.

Other media

Cancelled sequel
On the release of the fifth installment, Charles Bronson was reportedly unhappy with the film, along with the third and the fourth installments. Because of the film's failure at the box office, Bronson promised not to reprise his role as Paul Kersey in future installments, if there were any to come. However, Menahem Golan later reported of his plans to make a sixth film titled Death Wish 6: The New Vigilante, releasing somewhere in the late 1990s and introducing a new follower for Paul Kersey to keep up the legacy of vigilantism. However, the film project was cancelled after Golan's company, 21st Century Film Corporation, went bankrupt in 1996. Bronson subsequently appeared in the television film, Family of Cops (1995) and its two sequels.

In 1998, 2 years after the bankruptcy of 21st Century Film Corporation, Golan formed a new small production company named, "New Cannon, Inc.". After his lack of ideas for any upcoming films, Golan recalled the abandoned script of the sixth Death Wish installment and began reviving it as an entirely separate vigilante film titled Death Game that would go on to be released direct-to-video in 2001. The film tells a story about Jackie Stewart, a growing basketball star in his school, who gets lured into a local mob organization. Stewart's team coach and a cop, Micky Haiden is the only man that can save Jackie from the mob before they manage to use Jackie for criminal purposes. The film received negative reviews upon its release with critics calling it, "A waste of time with a wasted idea".

Film based on novel's sequel
In 2007, Kevin Bacon would star in James Wan's Death Sentence, loosely based on Brian Garfield's novel of the same name. The film stars Kevin Bacon as Nick Hume, a man who takes the law into his own hands when his son is murdered by a gang as an initiation ritual.

Remake

In 2018, Bruce Willis would star as Paul Kersey in Eli Roth's remake of the Bronson's original classic, Death Wish (1974). In the remake, Paul Kersey works in Chicago as a doctor who sets out to get revenge on the men who were responsible for his wife's death.

References

External links
 
 
 

5
1994 films
1994 action thriller films
1990s Christmas films
1990s English-language films
1990s vigilante films
American action thriller films
American Christmas films
American sequel films
American vigilante films
Films about the New York City Police Department
Films about witness protection
Films directed by Allan A. Goldstein
Films set in New York City
Films shot in Toronto
Films with screenplays by Michael Colleary
Films with screenplays by Allan A. Goldstein
Films produced by Damian Lee
Films scored by Terry Plumeri
1990s American films